The F2000 Italian Formula Trophy is an open wheel racing series based in Italy. The series has run since 2014 under Formula Libre rules with mainly older Formula 3 cars and engines in use. Notable regular circuits include the Formula One circuits of Monza, Red Bull Ring and Imola.

Champions

References

External links 
F2000 Italian Formula Trophy official website

Formula Three series
Formula 3
2014 establishments in Italy
Recurring sporting events established in 2014